Gill College is a South African high school in Somerset East, Sarah Baartman District Municipality. It was founded in 1869 as a university.

The school's namesake, Dr. William Gill, died in 1863 and left an estate equivalent to £23,000 for the establishment of a college of higher education.  Dr Gill nominated seven men to form Gill College Corporation. Included in the seven was James Leonard who was a prominent lawyer, another Dr Langham Dale. The corporation set about building the college.  Gill College was officially opened on March 18, 1869.  The architecture was based on that of the University of Glasgow.

In 1903, a change in educational regulations caused Gill College to become a high school.  The high school was coeducational before 1928 and again after 1965; between those dates it was a boys' school.

Notable alumni
Michael du Plessis, former South African rugby union player
Willie du Plessis, former South African rugby union player
James Weston Leonard, former Attorney-General of the Cape Colony
Hannes Marais, former South African rugby union player
FA Meiring, former South African rugby union player
James Rose Innes, former Chief Justice of South Africa

References

External links
 
 https://web.archive.org/web/20110814054231/http://d4512446.u80.securedc.com/E/geskiedenis.html

Schools in the Eastern Cape
1869 establishments in the Cape Colony
Sarah Baartman District Municipality